Baskcomb is a surname. Notable people with the surname include:

Betty Baskcomb (1914–2003), British film and television actor
John Baskcomb (1916–2000), British film and television character actor

See also
Bascom (disambiguation)
Bascomb
Bascome
Bascombe